ʿĪsā ibn Mūsā ibn Muḥammad ibn ʿAlī ibn ʿAbd Allāh ibn al-ʿAbbās (–783/4) was a nephew of the first two Abbasid caliphs, as-Saffah and al-Mansur, and for a long time heir-apparent of the Caliphate, until he was superseded by al-Mansur's son al-Mahdi.

Life 
Isa ibn Musa was born in AH 103 (721/2 CE). In summer 750, immediately after the end of the Abbasid Revolution, Isa was appointed by his uncle as-Saffah as governor of Kufa, the first seat of the Abbasid government. He would retain the post for fifteen years—according to Hugh N. Kennedy, the second longest tenure in the Abbasid period after that of Dawud ibn Yazid al-Muhallabi in the early 9th century.

In 754, -Saffah was nearing his death, and as his designated heir Abu Ja'far (al-Mansur) was on pilgrimage in Mecca at the time, the Caliph appointed Isa, then about 34 years old, as the second heir, in the event anything should happen to al-Mansur. This move was necessary to prevent Abu Muslim, the powerful and popular general who had begun the Abbasid Revolution in Khurasan, from rising to the position of king-maker. Isa had already proven his ability as governor, and his proximity to the capital, al-Anbar, was crucial for a swift succession. When as-Saffah finally died, Isa proclaimed al-Mansur Abu Ja'far as Caliph and sent riders to notify him of his accession. According to the sources recorded by al-Tabari, Isa placed guards before the treasuries and government offices in the capital, until the new caliph arrived there. He also sent as-Saffah's chamberlain, Abu Ghassan, to inform Abdallah ibn Ali in Syria of as-Saffah's death and receive the oath of allegiance (bay'ah) from him.

Following Abdallah ibn Ali's failed rebellion in his bid for the caliphate, Isa intervened to grant Abd al-Samad ibn Ali, who alone among Abdallah's brothers had supported his revolt, a pardon. Isa had cordial relations with Abu Muslim, and was left unaware of al-Mansur's plot to kill the dangerously powerful commander until after the deed was done. Under al-Mansur, he remained as governor of Kufa, took actively part in the planning of the new Abbasid capital, Baghdad, and built the al-Ukhaidir Fortress.

In 762–763, he led the army and suppressed the Alid revolts under the brothers Muhammad al-Nafs al-Zakiyya and Ibrahim ibn Abdallah. Muhammad's choice of Medina to raise his revolt was a potent symbol but a strategic error, as al-Mansur immediately realised. The Caliph sent Isa with 4,000 men against Muhammad. The Abbasid army easily cut the city off from outside support and quickly overran Muhammad's supporters. Muhammad himself was killed, and Isa sent his head to Caliph al-Mansur. Muhammad's brother Ibrahim, who had chosen Basra as his base, was more successful, but failed to synchronise his revolt there with the uprising of Medina. As a result, Isa was able to suppress Muhammad in Medina and then bring his forces against the Basra rebels, who were met in battle at Bakhamra. There the Alids initially gained the upper hand, but in the end Isa's perseverance brought the Abbasids victory.

Nevertheless, in 764/5 Isa was pressured into ceding his place in the succession to al-Mansur's son, al-Mahdi. Eventually, in 776, al-Mahdi, now Caliph, forced him to renounce his place in the succession altogether in favour of al-Mahdi's son Musa al-Hadi (r. 785–786). He died in 783/4.

References

Sources
 
 
 

720s births
780s deaths
8th-century Arabs
Abbasids
Governors of Kufa
Governors of the Abbasid Caliphate
Heirs apparent who never acceded
8th-century people from the Abbasid Caliphate